Bimbo Thomas  is a Nigerian actress, film producer and entrepreneur.

Early life and education
Bimbo Thomas was born in Lagos to a family of seven.
She holds a degree in Creative Arts from the University of Lagos.

Career
Thomas started her acting career as a trainee with the Odun Ifa Group. She is known for her character role in Omo Ghetto and its sequel Omo Ghetto: The Saga.

Filmography
Omo Ghetto: The Saga
Omo Ghetto
Oludamoran
Aye Are
Eruku Nla
Opolo
Omo Poly
Omoniyun 
Hell cat (2019)
Omoniyun (2019)
Honeymoon (2021)
Rancor (2022)

References

External links

Living people
Yoruba actresses
Nigerian film actresses
University of Lagos alumni
Year of birth missing (living people)
Nigerian film producers
21st-century Nigerian actresses
Nigerian businesspeople
Nigerian women in business